Edward Pasqual Dozier (born Eduardo de Pascua Dozier; 1916 in Santa Clara Pueblo, New Mexico – 1971 in Tucson, Arizona) was a Pueblo Native American anthropologist and linguist who studied Native Americans and the peoples of northern Luzon in the Philippines.

Dozier was of Tewa ethnicity, from Santa Clara Pueblo. He spoke only Tewa to the age of 12. His father, Thomas Dozier, was an Anglo-American schoolteacher who was adopted into a Tewa clan. His mother, Maria Lucaria Gutierrez, was a member of the Tewa Badger clan (her Tewa name was P'oo kwi tsaawaa). Eduardo and his siblings were raised as members of the Winter moiety of the Santa Clara pueblo.

During World War II, Dozier served in the US Army Air Corps in the Pacific theater. At that time he anglicized his name to Edward P. Dozier.

He earned his BA from the University of New Mexico in anthropology in 1947. He later earned a MA from the same institution. His PhD was from the University of California, Los Angeles in 1952.

Beginning in 1953 he taught classes at several universities, ultimately at the Tucson campus of the University of Arizona.

Works

References

Further reading
  biography of Dozier

1916 births
1971 deaths
20th-century Native Americans
Native American anthropologists
Linguists from the United States
Santa Clara Pueblo people
Native American writers
Native American linguists
University of California, Los Angeles alumni
University of Arizona faculty
University of New Mexico alumni
20th-century American anthropologists
20th-century linguists